James Tyler Laird (September 10, 1897 – August 16, 1970) was a professional American football player who played running back for the Rochester Jeffersons, the Buffalo All-Americans, the Canton Bulldogs, the Providence Steam Rollers, and the Staten Island Stapletons. In 1926, he was a player-coach for the Providence Steam Rollers. Laird was also a coach for Norwich University in Northfield, Vermont. In 1921 Laird played for the New York Brickley Giants, however he is not listed as being on the team as he played for the Giants only when they played non-league opponents. He also played for the independent Union Quakers of Philadelphia in 1921.

Laird had a son, also named James Tyler Laird, who was the chair of the psychology department at St. John's University in Collegeville, Minnesota. James, Jr. married Geraldine Anderson of Montreal. The two raised two children. James, Jr. taught for a time at the army bases in Korea.

References

External links
 

1897 births
1970 deaths
American football running backs
Buffalo All-Americans players
Canton Bulldogs players
Colgate Raiders football players
New York Brickley Giants players
Norwich Cadets football coaches
Providence Steam Roller coaches
Providence Steam Roller players
Rochester Jeffersons players
Staten Island Stapletons players
Union Quakers of Philadelphia players
People from Montpelier, Vermont
Players of American football from Vermont